The FIBA Africa Under-20 Championship for Women was a basketball competition in the International Basketball Federation's FIBA Africa zone. The event was held only twice, in 2002 and 2006, before being cancelled. The winners competed in the FIBA Under-21 World Championship for Women.

Summary

Participating nations

World U-21 Championship for Women record

See also
 FIBA Africa Championship for Women
 FIBA Africa Under-18 Championship for Women
 FIBA Africa Under-16 Championship for Women

References

 
Women's basketball competitions in Africa between national teams
Africa